Carabus paraysi is a species of ground beetle in the family Carabidae. It is found in eastern Europe.

Subspecies
These two subspecies belong to the species Carabus paraysi:
 Carabus paraysi paraysi Palliardi, 1825
 Carabus paraysi plassensis Born, 1907

References

Carabus
Beetles described in 1825